Shimon Dzigan (born 1905 in Łódź - April 14, 1980 in Tel Aviv) was a Polish Jewish comedian. 

His father was a soldier in the Imperial Russian army. After the outbreak of the First World War Dzigan was apprenticed to a tailor to help the family make ends meet. Moyshe Broderzon was impressed by Dzigan's improvised parodies in 1927 and invited Dzigan to join the Ararat literary cabaret (kleynkunst theater) that he was founding in Łódź with his friends. After Ararat was closed Dzigan teamed up with Israel Shumacher, to form the most famous Yiddish comic duo "Dzigan and Shumacher". The duo drew comparisons to Abbott and Costello. According to one writer, "one of their most famous sketches, 'Einstein Weinstein', plays a lot like "Who's on First."

Dzigan and Shumacher made many films and stage shows in Poland and later in Israel. In 1935 they founded their own cabaret company (the "Nowości Theater") in Warsaw.
"The performances of Dzigan and Shumacher typically opened with skits based on items from daily newspapers. Their humor was aimed at antisemites and government functionaries, but also at themselves and their public. Routines based on domestic life would follow. Dzigan’s persona was that of a hyperactive, happy beggar, endlessly complaining about life as he darted about the stage with his signature red handkerchief hanging from his pocket. The bespectacled Shumacher, in fundamental contrast, was phlegmatic and restrained, glossing his Jewish troubles with subtle gestures of the shoulders and hands."
When Germany invaded Poland, Dzigan and Shumacher fled to Soviet-occupied Białystok where they pulled their company back together and toured Minsk, Moscow, Leningrad, Kiev, Kharkov, and other Soviet localities. The composer Shaul Berezovsky wrote music for their troupe during this period.

Both were incarcerated in Stalinist Gulag labor camps. In 1948 the duo returned to Poland. The duo played themselves at Poland's Yiddish language feature made in 1948 called "Unzere kinder", the first feature film about the Holocaust in Poland ever made. In 1950 they emigrated to Israel to rebuild the brilliant artistic path they had forged in Europe and the USA. They performed thirty years on stage and countless performances across the globe. Their works were made into an historic Yiddish-language television program, broadcast in Israel in the 1970s.

After Shumacher died, Dzigan went on performing until his own death in 1980.

References

1905 births
1980 deaths
Jewish cabaret performers
Polish emigrants to Israel
Yiddish theatre performers
Yiddish comedians
Polish comedians
Polish cabaret performers
Israeli male comedians
Israeli Ashkenazi Jews
Jewish Israeli comedians
Entertainers from Łódź
20th-century comedians
Yiddish-language satirists
Burials at Kiryat Shaul Cemetery
Jewish Polish comedians